David Van Gelder House is located in Ramsey, Bergen County, New Jersey, United States. The house was built in 1810 and was added to the National Register of Historic Places on January 10, 1983.

See also
National Register of Historic Places listings in Bergen County, New Jersey

References

Houses on the National Register of Historic Places in New Jersey
Houses completed in 1810
Houses in Bergen County, New Jersey
National Register of Historic Places in Bergen County, New Jersey
Ramsey, New Jersey
New Jersey Register of Historic Places